Carlos Alberto Bianchezi, better known as Careca Bianchezi (born 25 August 1964) is a Brazilian former professional footballer who played as a striker.

Club career
Throughout his club career, Careca Bianchezi for Brazilian sides Marília, Guarani and Palmeiras, as well as in Italy for Atalanta and in Mexico for C.F. Monterrey.

International career
At international level, Careca Bianchezi was part of the Brazilian squad who finished as runners-up at 1991 Copa América, being sent off against Argentina.

References

External links

1964 births
Living people
Association football forwards
Brazilian footballers
Brazil international footballers
Brazilian expatriate footballers
Marília Atlético Clube players
Guarani FC players
Sociedade Esportiva Palmeiras players
Atalanta B.C. players
C.F. Monterrey players
Serie A players
Liga MX players
Expatriate footballers in Italy
Expatriate footballers in Mexico
Footballers from São Paulo